Salvia dolichantha is a herbaceous perennial native to Sichuan province in China, growing at  elevation.

Notes

dolichantha
Flora of Sichuan